The Premio Aztlán Literary Prize is a national literary award for emerging Chicana and Chicano authors, founded in 1993 by Rudolfo and Patricia Anaya. The award was originally sponsored by the University of New Mexico, but was moved in 2008 to the National Hispanic Cultural Center.

The award is limited to short-story collections and novels (but not children's or young-adult novels) published by a professional press during the previous calendar year. Moreover, the author must be living and must not have published more than two books. The winner receives $1,000 and presents a lecture at that year's National Latino Writers Conference.

Award recipients include (years refer to the year of publication; the award is given the following year):

 2013: ire'ne lara silva, flesh to bone
 2009: Gloria Zamora, Sweet Nata: Growing Up in Rural New Mexico
 2008: Patricia Santana, Ghosts of El Grullo
 2007: Verónica Gonzalez, Twin Time or How Death Befell Me
 2006: Reyna Grande, Across a Hundred Mountains
 2005: Gene Guerin, Cottonwood Saints
 2004: Mary Helen Lagasse, The Fifth Sun
 2003-2000: no award
 1999: Sergio Troncoso, The Last Tortilla and Other Stories
 1998: Ronald Ruiz, Giuseppe Rocco
 1997: Pat Mora, House of Houses
 1996: Wendell Mayo, Centaur of the North
 1995: Norma Elia Cantú, Canícula: Snapshots of a Girlhood en la Frontera
 1994: Denise Chávez, Face of an Angel
 1993: Alicia Gaspar de Alba, The Mystery of Survival and Other Stories

References

American literary awards
Hispanic and Latino American literature
Awards honoring Hispanic and Latino Americans
Mexican-American literature
Literary awards honoring minority groups